The 1936 Michigan gubernatorial election was held on November 3, 1936. Democratic nominee Frank Murphy defeated incumbent Republican Frank Fitzgerald with 51.02% of the vote.

General election

Candidates
Major party candidates
Frank Murphy, Democratic
Frank Fitzgerald, Republican
Other candidates
John Monarch, Socialist
Simeon P. Martin, Farmer–Labor
Philip Raymond, Communism
Clayton O'Donohue, Socialist Labor
Ray T. Fuller, Commonwealth
Charles F. Mann, American

Results

Primaries

Democratic Primary

Republican Primary

References

1936
Michigan
Gubernatorial
November 1936 events